James Obeyesekere may refer to:

 Sir James Peter Obeyesekere I, Ceylonese lawyer and legislator
 Sir James Peter Obeyesekere II (1879–1968), Head Mudaliyar
 Deshamanya James Peter Obeyesekere III (1915–2007), Sri Lankan politician